Sairi Forsman (born 1964 in Mexico City, Distrito Federal) is a Mexican sculptor of Danish descent.

Throughout her creative process, Sairi Forsman has gone through different stages: first, sculpture inspired by an early cubism; then entangled bodies, knot-forms with rounded outlines that tell stories about ancient mythologies of Western Culture; then skeletal representations of humans and animals. She is inspired by literature, painting, dance, sculpture and cinema.

She has participated in collective exhibitions and has had solo shows sponsored by institutions, such as the Universidad Nacional Autónoma de México, the Instituto Nacional de Bellas Artes, the Poliforum Cultural Siquieros and the Palacio de Mineria. Her work has been published by the art magazine "Artes de Mexico" as well as the European Economic Community. She has won the Nordic Arts Center fellowship in Helsinki, Finland. The sculptures "Fantasy I", "Temptation", "Perses", "The Cannibal" and "Au Prin-Temps" are large-scale pieces. They are installed in public places and are on permanent view.

References

1964 births
Living people
Mexican people of Danish descent
Artists from Mexico City
Mexican women artists
20th-century Mexican sculptors
21st-century sculptors
20th-century Mexican women artists
21st-century Mexican women artists